The 2015–16 Georgian Cup (also known as the David Kipiani Cup) was the nighteen season overall and the twenty-six since independence of the Georgian annual football tournament. The competition began on 17 August 2015 and finished on 18 May 2016.

The defending champions are Dinamo Tbilisi, after winning their twelfth Georgian Cup last season. The winner of the competition qualified for the first qualifying round of the 2016–17 UEFA Europa League.

First round
The first legs were held on 17 and 18 August, with the return matches held 25 and 26 August.

First legs

Second legs

Second round
The first legs were held on 16 September, with the return matches held 27 and 28 October.

First legs

Second legs

Quarterfinals
The first legs were held on 2 December 2015 with the return matches held 16 December 2015.

First legs

Second legs

Semi-finals
The first legs were held on 20 April 2016 with the return matches held 5 May 2016.

First legs

Second legs

Final
Final match were held on 18 May 2016 in Kutaisi. That was the first final which was played outside Tbilisi.

See also 
 2015–16 Umaglesi Liga
 2015–16 Pirveli Liga

References

External links
 Official site 

Georgian Cup seasons
Cup
Georgian Cup